Goni Naor (born 23 April 1999) is an Israeli footballer who plays as a midfielder for Maccabi Haifa in the Israeli Premier League.

Early life
Naor was born in Har Adar, Israel, to a Jewish family.

Club career
Naor grew up in the Beitar Jerusalem youth academy. In 2015, signed for the Maccabi Tel Aviv. Two years later, signed to Hapoel Katamon. He made his debut with the senior team on 3 August 2017.

On 31 July 2021, Naor scored the only goal in the 1-0 win against Beitar Jerusalem, which was the first Jerusalem derby match in 21 years.

International career
Naor has been a youth international since 2015.

He was called up for the senior Israel national team in October 2021, during their 2022 FIFA World Cup qualifiers - UEFA.

References

External links

 

1999 births
Israeli Jews
Living people
Israeli footballers
Hapoel Katamon Jerusalem F.C. players
Hapoel Jerusalem F.C. players
Maccabi Haifa F.C. players
Israel international footballers
Israeli Premier League players
Liga Leumit players
Israeli settlers
Israel youth international footballers
Association football midfielders